Nest usurpation is when the queen of one species of eusocial insects takes over the colony of another species.

Cuckoo bumblebees (Psithyrus) and brood-parasitic paper wasps (e.g., Polistes sulcifer) are known for usurpation.

Nest usurpation most frequently occurs during the late pre-emergence stage of a nest. A foundress is a member of one species, usually female that finds a nest in the late pre-emergence stage and takes control of the colony of that nest. A usurper or queen is a member of one species, usually female that gives raise to and controls the colony of a particular nest.  

Among Metapolybia cingulata, it is very common to observe queens taking over other M. cingulata colonies, however it has also been noted that if the two colonies are similar enough, the exchange of workers or queens can be relatively smooth.

References

Insect behavior
Hymenoptera ecology